The discography of Yellowcard, an American pop punk band from Jacksonville, Florida, consists of ten studio albums, eleven singles, two live albums, two extended plays, one video album, and two compilation albums.

Yellowcard with their original frontman & founder Benjamin Harper released their debut album, Midget Tossing, on April 1, 1997, via DIY Records. This album, along with their next two efforts, Where We Stand (1999) and Ryan Key's debut One for the Kids (2001), failed to garner any chart success on the Billboard music charts. Also, no singles were ever released from any of these albums.

However, in 2003, they achieved breakthrough success with the release of their major label debut Ocean Avenue. The album charted within the Top 30 of the Billboard 200, as well as the Top 10 in New Zealand. The album's title track was a Billboard Hot 100 Top 40 single and was certified Platinum by the Recording Industry Association of America, becoming a seminal pop punk song. The follow-up single, "Only One", was certified Gold. The album was then certified Platinum in the US by July 2004 and remains as Yellowcard's commercial peak.

Their fifth album, Lights and Sounds (2006), was an even bigger success on the Billboard 200, peaking within the Top 5. While not charting a Top 40 single on the Hot 100, the album's title track reached number 50 on the chart, as well as becoming their highest chart entry on the Hot Modern Rock Tracks (now Alternative Songs) chart. They then released Paper Walls in 2007 before taking a two-year hiatus in 2008. They reformed in 2010 and released When You're Through Thinking, Say Yes on March 22, 2011. Southern Air, was released on August 14, 2012 to universal acclaim. Lift a Sail was released October 7, 2014 to generally favorable reviews. Their eponymous tenth and final studio album was released September 30, 2016.

Albums

Studio albums

Live albums

Compilation albums

Other albums

Extended plays

Singles

Notes

Other appearances

Videography

Video albums

Music videos

References

External links
 Official Yellowcard Website
 Official Myspace

Discographies of American artists
Pop punk group discographies